Gillin may refer to:

People

 Hugh Gillin (1925–2004), American actor
 John Gillin, American oilman who commissioned Frank Lloyd Wright to design the John Gillin Residence
 Margarete Garvin Gillin (1833–1915), Canadian painter
 John Lewis Gillin
 John Phillip Gillin
 R. Charles Gillin (born 1951), American Anglican bishop

Other uses
 Gillin Boat Club, Fairmount Park, Philadelphia
 Gillin's Beach, Kauai, Hawaii
 John Gillin Residence designed by Frank Lloyd Wright in Dallas, Texas